Gmina Zakrzewo may refer to either of the following rural administrative districts in Poland:
Gmina Zakrzewo, Kuyavian-Pomeranian Voivodeship
Gmina Zakrzewo, Greater Poland Voivodeship